Joakim Anders Andersson (born 5 February 1989) is a Swedish former professional ice hockey centre who played in the for Swedish Hockey League (SHL) and with the Detroit Red Wings in the National Hockey League (NHL). Andersson was drafted 88th overall by the Red Wings in the 2007 NHL Entry Draft.

Playing career
Andersson is a product of Munkedals BK. In 2005, he joined the youth ranks of Frölunda HC and made his debut in Sweden's top-tier SHL with Frölunda's men's team during the 2006-07 season.

He moved to North America prior to the 2010-11 campaign. Andersson played over two full seasons for the Grand Rapids Griffins of the American Hockey League. He had 10 goals and 17 assists in 36 games in the 2012-13 season, when he was promoted to the NHL.

Andersson was recalled from Grand Rapids by the Detroit Red Wings in February 2013. He scored his first NHL goal on 15 February 2013, against Viktor Fasth of the Anaheim Ducks.

On 6 August 2013, the Red Wings re-signed Andersson to a two-year, $1.465 million contract. On 26 June 2015, the Red Wings re-signed Andersson to a one-year, $815,000 contract.

On 22 January 2016, Andersson was placed on waivers by the Red Wings, and later assigned to the Grand Rapids Griffins on 24 January. He was recalled by the Red Wings on 26 January. On 12 February, Andersson was assigned to the Griffins. On 8 April, Andersson was recalled by the Detroit Red Wings.

On 30 April 2016, Andersson signed a two-year contract with Örebro HK of the Swedish Hockey League (SHL). He later moved to HV71 on 17 April 2018, securing a two-year contract.

At the conclusion of his contract with HV71, Andersson initially signed with KooKoo of the Finnish Liiga, however was unable to pass a physical. He later announced his retirement from professional hockey after thirteen professional seasons on 14 December 2020.

International play

Andersson is the all-time junior international games played leader for Sweden. He has played in four major international tournaments, his first being the 2006 IIHF World U18 Championships. The following year Andersson helped Sweden win a bronze medal at the 2007 IIHF World U18 Championships. At the 2008 World Junior Ice Hockey Championships Andersson helped Sweden to a silver medal, with six assists in six games he was tied for third in the tournament assist leaders.

The following year at the 2009 World Junior Ice Hockey Championships, Andersson was an alternate captain, totaling three goals and three assists while centering Sweden's successful second line with wingers Magnus Pääjärvi-Svensson and Simon Hjalmarsson.

Career statistics

Regular season and playoffs

International

References

External links

1989 births
Living people
Borås HC players
Detroit Red Wings draft picks
Detroit Red Wings players
Frölunda HC players
Grand Rapids Griffins players
HV71 players
Örebro HK players
People from Munkedal Municipality
Swedish expatriate ice hockey players in the United States
Swedish ice hockey centres
Sportspeople from Västra Götaland County